Padari may refer to:

 anything of, from, or related to Padar, a region of Jammu and Kashmir, India
 Padari dialect, an Indo-Aryan dialect
 Padari, Estonia, a village in Estonia
 Padari, Pindra, a village in Uttar Pradesh, India
 Padari, Iran, a village in Iran

See also
 Padri (disambiguation)